An agrochemical or agrichemical, a contraction of agricultural chemical, is a chemical product used in industrial agriculture. Agrichemical refers to biocides (pesticides including insecticides, herbicides, fungicides and nematicides) and synthetic fertilizers. It may also include hormones and other chemical growth agents.

Agrochemicals are counted among speciality chemicals.

Categories

Biological action

In most of the cases, agrochemicals refer to pesticides.
Pesticides
Insecticides
Herbicides
Fungicides
Algaecides
Rodenticides
Molluscicides
Nematicides
Fertilisers
Soil conditioners
Liming and acidifying agents
Plant growth regulators

Application method
Fumigants
Penetrant

Ecology

Many agrochemicals are toxic, and agrichemicals in bulk storage may pose significant environmental and/or health risks, particularly in the event of accidental spills. In many countries, use of agrichemicals is highly regulated. Government-issued permits for purchase and use of approved agrichemicals may be required. Significant penalties can result from misuse, including improper storage resulting in spillage. On farms, proper storage facilities and labeling, emergency clean-up equipment and procedures, and safety equipment and procedures for handling, application and disposal are often subject to mandatory standards and regulations. Usually, the regulations are carried out through the registration process.

For instance, bovine somatotropin, though widely used in the United States, is not approved in Canada and some other jurisdictions as there are concerns for the health of cows using it.

History 
Sumerians from 4500 years ago have said to use insecticides in the form of sulfur compounds. Additionally, the Chinese from about 3200 years ago used mercury and arsenic compounds to control the body lice.

Agrochemicals were introduced to protect crops from pests and enhance crop yields. The most common agrochemicals include pesticides and fertilizers. Chemical fertilizers in the 1960s were responsible for the beginning of the "Green Revolution", where using the same surface of land using intensive irrigation and mineral fertilizers such as nitrogen, phosphorus, and potassium has greatly increased food production. Throughout the 1970s through 1980s, pesticide research continued into producing more selective agrochemicals. Due to the adaptation of pests to these chemicals, more and new agrochemicals were being used, causing side effects in the environment.

Companies
Syngenta was the Chinese owned worldwide leader in agrochemical sales in 2013 at approximately US$10.9 billion, followed by Bayer CropScience, BASF, Dow AgroSciences, Monsanto, and then DuPont with about $3.6 billion. It is still in the worldwide leading position based on sales of year 2019. Based on a statistics by statistica, In 2019, the agrochemical market worldwide was worth approximately $234.2 billion. This is expected to increase to more than $300 billion in 2025.

See also
Index of pesticide articles
Agricultural chemistry
Ecocide
Eutrophication
National Agricultural Statistics Service (NASS)
Nutrient pollution

References

External links

 
Environmental chemistry
Industrial agriculture
Nutrient pollution
Organic farming